Maggie Naouri is an Australian actress. She was nominated for the 2016 AACTA Award for Best Actress in a Leading Role for her role in Joe Cinque's Consolation.

Naouri was educated at Trinity Lutheran College on the Gold Coast in Queensland. In 2012, she graduated from the Victorian College of Arts with a Bachelor of Dramatic Arts.

Filmography

TV 
Sisters (2017) TV series – Phoebe (1 episode)
Sunshine (2017) TV mini series – Rima Saad (3 episodes)
Glitch (2017) TV series – Alison (1 episode)
Wentworth (2014–15) TV series – Rose Atkins (19 episodes)
Offspring (2014) TV series – Mary (1 episode)
Neighbours (2013–14) TV series – Gazza (1 episode)

Film 
Joe Cinque's Consolation (2016) – Anu Singh

References

External links
 

Australian film actresses
Living people
Year of birth missing (living people)